Maffei 2 is an intermediate spiral galaxy about 10 million light-years away in the constellation Cassiopeia.  Maffei 2 and Maffei 1 were both discovered by Paolo Maffei in 1968 from their infrared emission.  Maffei 2 lies in the Zone of Avoidance and is about 99.5% obscured by the Milky Way's foreground dust clouds, and as a result is barely detectable at optical wavelengths.  It had been suggested soon after its discovery that Maffei 2 may be a member of the Local Group, but it is now thought to be a member of another nearby group, the IC 342/Maffei Group, the galaxy group that is the closest to the Local Group.

Gallery

See also
 Dwingeloo 1
 NGC 1300

References

External links

 
 
 
 
 

Intermediate spiral galaxies
IC 342/Maffei Group
Cassiopeia (constellation)
10217
Sharpless objects
Astronomical objects discovered in 1968
UGCA objects